The 1988 Philippine Basketball Association (PBA) All-Filipino Conference was the second conference of the 1988 PBA season. It started on June 26 and ended on September 13, 1988. The tournament is an All-Filipino format, which does not allow an import for each team. The Philippine national basketball team played as guest team for this conference.

Format
The following format will be observed for the duration of the conference:
 Double-round robin eliminations; 12 games per team; Teams are then seeded by basis on win–loss records.
 The two teams with the worst record after the elimination round will be eliminated.
 Semifinals will be two round robin affairs with the five remaining teams. Results from the elimination round will be carried over.
 The top two teams in the semifinals advance to the best of five finals. The last two teams dispute the third-place trophy in a best-of-three playoff.

Elimination round

Semifinals

Cumulative standings

Semifinal round standings:

Third place playoffs

Finals

References

PBA Philippine Cup
All-Filipino Conference